Reymond Langton Design is a design studio specialising in the interior decoration of superyachts. It was founded by Pascale Reymond and Andrew Langton in 2001, and was originally based in London. The company headquarters and principal design studio subsequently relocated to the city of Bath.

Reymond Langton Design has been involved in the interior decoration of a number of motor and sail yachts, including:

 Aviva (2007)
 C2 (2008)
 Eminence (2008)
 Titan (2010)
 Amaryllis (2011)
 Serene (2011)
 Elysian (2014)
 Kismet (2014)
 Lady Lara (2015)
 Aviva (2017)

References

External links
Reymond Langton Design official web site

British yacht designers
Companies based in Bath, Somerset
Design companies of the United Kingdom